Pulasthi Waruna Gunaratne (born 27 September 1973), known as Pulasthi Gunaratne, is a Sri Lankan former cricketer. He is a right-handed batsman and a right-arm medium-fast bowler.

Playing career
Already an experienced player at the time of his Sri Lanka debut in 2002, Gunaratne started playing for Bloomfield in 1993. A tricksy seam bowler, Gunaratne is also a skillful batsman. He participated in the 2003 World Cup.

References

1973 births
Living people
Sri Lankan cricketers
Sri Lanka One Day International cricketers
Basnahira South cricketers
Bloomfield Cricket and Athletic Club cricketers
Burgher Recreation Club cricketers
Antonians Sports Club cricketers
Tamil Union Cricket and Athletic Club cricketers
Nondescripts Cricket Club cricketers